Lord Macartney may refer to:

George Macartney, 1st Earl Macartney (1737-1806)
George Macartney (British consul) (1867–1945)
, an East Indiaman (1782-1811)